Reddyanus zideki is a species of scorpion in the family Buthidae.

References

Animals described in 1994
zideki